Channing Michael-de Stribling (born November 21, 1994) is an American football cornerback for the Philadelphia Stars of the United States Football League (USFL). He played college football at Michigan and went undrafted in the 2017 NFL Draft.

Professional career

Cleveland Browns
Stribling signed with the Cleveland Browns as an undrafted free agent on May 4, 2017. He was waived on September 1, 2017 and was signed to the practice squad on September 6. He was released by the Browns on September 19, 2017.

Indianapolis Colts
On September 26, 2017, Stribling was signed to the Indianapolis Colts' practice squad. He was released on November 6, 2017.

San Francisco 49ers
On November 29, 2017, Stribling was signed to the San Francisco 49ers' practice squad. He signed a reserve/future contract with the 49ers on January 2, 2018. Stribling was released on April 30, 2018.

Indianapolis Colts (second stint)
Stribling signed with the Indianapolis Colts on May 29, 2018, but was waived on June 14, 2018.

Los Angeles Chargers
On August 2, 2018, Stribling signed with the Los Angeles Chargers. He was waived on September 1, 2018. He was re-signed to the practice squad on September 26, 2018. He was released on October 10, 2018.

Memphis Express
On November 9, 2018, Stribling signed with the Memphis Express of the Alliance of American Football (AAF) for the 2019 season. The league ceased operations in April 2019.

Hamilton Tiger-Cats
Stribling was signed to the practice roster of the Hamilton Tiger-Cats of the Canadian Football League on September 23, 2019.

Seattle Dragons
In October 2019's 2020 XFL Draft, Stribling was selected by the Seattle Dragons. He had his contract terminated when the league suspended operations on April 10, 2020.

Hamilton Tiger-Cats (second stint)
Stribling re-signed with the Hamilton Tiger-Cats on May 12, 2020. After the CFL canceled the 2020 season due to the COVID-19 pandemic, Stribling chose to opt out of his contract with the Tiger-Cats on September 1, 2020. Stribling was selected by the Generals of The Spring League during its player selection draft on October 12, 2020, and opted back in to his contract with the Tiger-Cats on January 4, 2021.  Stribling spent most of his time on practice roster over two seasons. He did manage to dress for 4 games in 2021 but was ultimately released December 13, 2021.

Philadelphia Stars
Stribling was selected by the Philadelphia Stars in the eighth round of the 2022 USFL Draft. He was transferred to the inactive roster on May 14.

Washington Commanders
Stribling signed with the Washington Commanders on July 14, 2022. He was released on August 24, 2022.

Second stint with Stars 
On November 17, 2022, Stribling was drafted by the St. Louis BattleHawks of the XFL, but instead re-signed with the Stars of the USFL on January 5, 2023.

Statistics

References

External links

Michigan Wolverines bio

1994 births
Living people
Players of American football from North Carolina
American football cornerbacks
Michigan Wolverines football players
Cleveland Browns players
Indianapolis Colts players
San Francisco 49ers players
Los Angeles Chargers players
People from Matthews, North Carolina
Memphis Express (American football) players
Hamilton Tiger-Cats players
Seattle Dragons players
The Spring League players
Philadelphia Stars (2022) players
Washington Commanders players